Alan William George Liddell (8 August 1930 – 9 February 1972) was an English cricketer.  Liddell was a right-handed batsman who bowled right-arm medium pace.  The son of Allan Liddell, who played first-class cricket for Northamptonshire, he was born in Northampton, Northamptonshire.

Liddell made his first-class debut for Northamptonshire against Derbyshire in the 1951 County Championship.  He made 17 first-class further first-class appearances, the last of which came against Derbyshire in the 1955 County Chamoionship.  In his 18 first-class appearances, he scored 201 runs at an average of 14.35, with a high score of 38 not out.  With the ball, he took 24 wickets at a bowling average of 58.29, with best figures of 3/62.

He died in Duston, Northamptonshire on 9 February 1972.

References

External links
Alan Liddell at ESPNcricinfo
Alan Liddell at CricketArchive

1930 births
1972 deaths
Cricketers from Northampton
English cricketers
Northamptonshire cricketers